Ten to chi to (lit. Heaven and earth and [humanity]) is the Japanese counterpart of the concept  (lit. Heaven–earth–human) in Chinese theology.

Ten to chi to may also refer to:

Heaven and Earth (1990 film), also called , a Japanese samurai film
Ten to Chi to (TV series), seventh edition of the Japanese  drama television series
Heaven and Earth (天と地と), also called , a free skate program by Japanese figure skater Yuzuru Hanyu